Muchowiec may refer to the following places in Poland:
Muchowiec, a district of the city of Katowice
Muchowiec, a village in Strzelin County, Lower Silesian Voivodeship (SW Poland)